Monzievaird is a place in Scotland, situated  west of Crieff in Highland District of Perth and Kinross. The village of Monzie; (pronounced Mon ee) is a couple of miles to the east-northeast.

Name

The place was originally named Muithauard c.1200, Moneward 1203. Two different etymologies are given for the name. In the first it is asserted that the name is derived from the Gaelic magh + bard; "Plain of the bards". (Locals pronounce it as Mon ee vaird). Under this view, the name of the nearby village of Monzie is unrelated except to render the pronunciation of the first syllable "Monz" as "Mon" in linguistic sympathy.  In the second etymology, Monzievaird comes from magh "plain" plus edha''' the genitive case of edh (iodh) "corn" plus the Saxon vaird'' or "ward" meaning "enclosure", rendering the total as "place where corn is stored". Under this view the village name of Monzie has the same origin as does the name of the nearby castle, Monzie Castle. Regardless of origin it gave its name to the nearby Loch Monzievaird.

Administration
Traditionally, Monzievaird was within the Stewardship of Strathearn and it had its own parish church. It was under the control of the Murrays of Tullibardine from the 13th century.

Following the Act of Union, it was placed in the county of Perthshire. In 1890 it was placed within the civil parish of Monzievaird and Strowan. In 1930 the civil parish system was replaced and Monzievaird was put in the Highland District of Perthshire. From 1975 to 1996 it was part of the Perthshire Kinross District in the Tayside region. In 1996 it came under the new county of Perth and Kinross.

Architecture

Ochtertyre House, the Murray family seat in Perthshire between 1784 and 1790 is located here, overlooking the Loch from an elevated position. Its grounds are a designed landscape. The house is a Georgian Category A listed building. It is now a private house, but in its time it has operated as a school (Seymour Lodge 1939–1965), a theatre, and a restaurant. The mausoleum of the Murrays, built in 1809, now stands where the parish church used to be.

Economy
The local Glenturret Distillery is a popular well known single malt Whisky.

History

The Battle of Monzievaird
On 25 March 1005 Malcolm II of Scotland fought and killed the father-and-son rulers of Scotland, Kenneth III of Scotland and his son Giric II of Scotland, a Mormaer. The site of the battle is on the north side of the loch.

King Kenneth's Cairn was built in memory of the son of King Duff, who was killed in the battle of Monzievaird that year and buried on Iona. It stands in a prominent position on the edge of the steep escarpment of Corrie Barvick.

The Massacre of Monzievaird
Immediately following the Battle of Knock Mary on 21 October 1490, the Drummonds and Campbells set fire to the old church of Monzievaird; some twenty Murrays were killed. James IV of Scotland, on news of the massacre, gave orders for the arrest of the main perpetrators, David Drummond and Duncan Campbell of Dunstaffnage. They were executed at Stirling shortly thereafter. The nation was horrified and this event was considered at the time to have been sacrilegious.

New York state
The town of Cornwall in the state of New York originated from a colony of twenty-five Scottish families who settled around the mouth of the Moodna Creek, led by the soldier Major Patrick McGregor and his brother-in-law, David Toiseach, the laird of Monzievaird, in 1685.

References

External links

An alternative view of the massacre with links and pictures
General Roy Map

Villages in Perth and Kinross